Alfred Absolem (born 23 January 1986) is an Indian first-class cricketer who plays for Hyderabad.

References

External links
 

1986 births
Living people
Indian cricketers
Hyderabad cricketers
Cricketers from Hyderabad, India